Psychic equivalence describes a mind-state where no distinction is drawn between the contents of the mind and the external world - where what is thought in the mind is assumed to be automatically true.

Origins
Psychic equivalence is a primitive mind-state which precedes in infancy the capacity for mentalization, that is, for reflection upon both inner and outer worlds. In psychic equivalence mode, if the child thinks there is a monster in the closet it believes there really is a monster in the closet; if the inner world feels harmonious, the world outside is also harmonious. 
Psychic equivalence is thus a form of concrete understanding of the world, self-convinced, that blocks all curiosity about alternative mind-views.

In later life
Psychic equivalence reappears in later life in the course of dreams, delusions, and traumatic flashbacks. It involves a temporary loss of awareness of the difference between external reality and the contents of the mind: thus in post traumatic stress disorder the individual is convinced (perhaps years later) they are actually back in the situation of the original trauma, a complete loss of perspective. 

Where a defensive false self has been built up since infancy to defend against the anxieties of psychic equivalence, subsequent collapse of the narcissistic structure can lead to the re-emergence of the terrifying impingement by reality of psychic equivalence.

See also

References

External links 
 psychic equivalence

Developmental psychology
Psychological concepts
Psychodynamics
Mindfulness (psychology)
Borderline personality disorder